Liege Lord is an American power metal band active in the 1980s. The band was formed by Matt Vinci, Anthony Truglio and Frank Cortese.

History 
Liege Lord was originally a Judas Priest cover band named Deceiver (after the Judas Priest song of the same name). Judas Priest's influence can be heard in the early vocals and guitar riffs of the Freedom's Rise album.

Liege Lord first signed on with the French record label Black Dragon after Christian Logue of Savage Grace recommended the company to the band. Freedom's Rise was released in 1985 on Black Dragon in Europe, and on Ironworks in America.

Reaching cult status in the metal world with their three releases, the band featured Joe Comeau, who would later go on to play with thrash metal bands Overkill and Annihilator. Guitarist Anthony Truglio went on to play in the band Gandhi with Page Hamilton from Helmet, and also played in the new version of Helmet. Guitarist Paul Nelson would go on to play with Blues/Rock icon Johnny Winter and winning a Grammy Award and multiple Grammy Nominations signing with his own solo artist deal on Sony/EMI Records. 

Master Control was recorded from March 22 to April 11, 1988. The album was produced by Terry Date and Liege Lord.

As of August 2012, Liege Lord has been active again and headlined the Keep It True XVI festival, which took place from April 19 to 20, 2013, at Tauberfrankenhalle in Lauda-Königshofen, Germany.

Discography

Albums 
Freedom's Rise (1985)
Burn to My Touch (1987)
Master Control (1988)

Singles and demos 
"Black Lit Knights" (1987)
Demo (1985)

Members 
Joe Comeau (vocals)
Tony Truglio (guitar)
Matt Vinci (bass)
Danny Wacker (guitar)
Van Williams (drums)

Former members 
Andy Michaud – vocals
Paul Nelson – guitar
Pete McCarthy – guitars
 Carlo Moscardini – bass
Frank Cortese – drums

References

External links 

Musical groups established in 1982
Musical groups disestablished in 1989
Musical groups reestablished in 2000
Musical groups disestablished in 2000
Musical groups reestablished in 2012
American power metal musical groups
Heavy metal musical groups from Connecticut
Musical quintets
1982 establishments in Connecticut
Metal Blade Records artists